Anton Weissenbacher (born 20 January 1965, in Baia Mare) is a former Romanian football right back, he was part of Steaua București squad, which won the European Cup in 1986, he also played in the Intercontinental Cup final in the same year. When he left Romania, during the 90s he went to play in Germany, in an amateur league and there he finished his career. He coached several amateur teams in Germany, including SV Mehring.

International career
Anton Weissenbacher played one friendly game at international level for Romania, making his appearance on 8 April 1987 when coach Emerich Jenei used him in a 3–2 home victory against Israel.

Honours

Club
Steaua București
Divizia A: 1985–86, 1986–87
Cupa României: 1986–87, 1988–89
European Cup: 1985–86
Intercontinental Cup runner-up: 1986
Eintracht Trier
Oberliga Südwest: 1993–94

Individual
 Total matches played in Romanian First League:'' 164 matches – 15 goals
 European Cups: 4 matches – 0 goals
 Romania U-21  8 matches – 0 goals
 Romania Olympic Team 7 matches – 0 goals
 Romania national football team 1 matches – 0 goals

References

External links

1965 births
Living people
Romanian footballers
CS Minaur Baia Mare (football) players
FC Steaua București players
CS Universitatea Craiova players
FC Bihor Oradea players
SV Eintracht Trier 05 players
Liga I players
Romanian people of German descent
Association football defenders
Romania international footballers
Romanian expatriate sportspeople in Germany
Romanian football managers
Romanian expatriate football managers
Expatriate football managers in Germany
Sportspeople from Baia Mare